Legends is the second solo studio album by Bob Catley, released by Frontiers Records in 1999.

The album's songs are based on legendary characters and literature, (Homer, Dracula, The Phantom of the Opera, etc..).

Track listing 
All songs written by Gary Hughes.

 "The Pain" — 5:40
 "Shelter from the Night" — 4:58
 "Carpe Diem" — 6:09
 "Tender Is the Night" — 5:20
 "Medusa" — 4:54
 "Hydra" — 5:20
 "A Beautiful Night for Love" — 5:41
 "Too Late" — 6:16
 "The Light" — 8:39
 "Where the Heart Is" — 3:14

Personnel
Bob Catley — vocals
Gary Hughes — vocals, keyboards
Vinny Burns — guitars
Steve McKenna — bass
John Cooksey — drums

Production
Produced by Gary Hughes
Mixing by Audu Obaje and Gary Hughes
Engineered by Audu Obaje
Additional Engineering by Neil Amison, Alex Tomlin, Vinny Burns and Gary Hughes

References

External links
 www.bobcatley.com — Official Bob Catley site

Bob Catley albums
1999 albums
Albums produced by Gary Hughes
Frontiers Records albums
Concept albums